Azgueilem Tiyab  is a town and commune in the Gorgol Region of southern Mauritania.

In 2000 it had a population of 9,056.

References

External links
Official site

Communes of Mauritania
Gorgol Region